Nikolo-Varvarinka is a rural locality (a selo) in Pchelinovskoye Rural Settlement, Bobrovsky District, Voronezh Oblast, Russia. The population was 956 as of 2010. There are 7 streets.

Geography 
Nikolo-Varvarinka is located 13 km south of Bobrov (the district's administrative centre) by road. Yasenki is the nearest rural locality.

References 

Rural localities in Bobrovsky District